Oleksiy Serhiyovych Khyzhnyak (born 9 January 2001) is a Ukrainian professional footballer who plays as a centre-back.

References

External links
 
 

2001 births
Living people
Footballers from Dnipro
Ukrainian footballers
Ukraine youth international footballers
Association football defenders
FC Dnipro players
SC Dnipro-1 players
FC Nikopol players
Ukrainian Second League players
Ukrainian Amateur Football Championship players